The following is a list of significant earthquakes for the period 2001–2010, listing earthquakes of magnitude 7 and above, or which caused fatalities. Deaths due to earthquake-caused tsunamis are included. In terms of fatalities, the 2004 Indian Ocean earthquake was the most destructive event, followed by the 2010 Haiti earthquake, 2005 Pakistan earthquake and 2008 Sichuan earthquake.

For lists of earthquakes by country, which may include smaller and less destructive events than those listed here, see Lists of earthquakes by country.

2001

2002

2003

2004

2005

2006

2007

2008

2009

2010

Notes

All times are UTC, unless otherwise stated
ML = Richter magnitude scale 
Mw = Moment magnitude 
Mb = Body wave magnitude 
HRV = Harvard University (Global CMT) 
USGS = United States Geological Survey

References

2001-2010